Yohan Chanuka (born 4 May 1994) is a Sri Lankan cricketer. He made his Twenty20 debut for Sri Lanka Ports Authority Cricket Club in the 2015-16 AIA Premier T20 Tournament on 13 January 2016. He made his List A debut for Sri Lanka Ports Authority Cricket Club in the 2018–19 Premier Limited Overs Tournament on 8 March 2019.

References

External links
 

1994 births
Living people
Sri Lankan cricketers
Sri Lanka Ports Authority Cricket Club cricketers
Place of birth missing (living people)